Bernard Ryan (–1921) was one of six men hanged in Mountjoy Prison, Dublin on 14 March 1921. He was a member of the Irish Republican Army (IRA) and part of the Dublin Brigade's Active Service Unit. He was one of The Forgotten Ten.

Background
He was born in the city of Dublin, the son of Joseph Ryan and Anne Ryan, née Plummer. Bernard, who was affectionately known as Bertie, was recorded with his widowed mother and his two sisters, Katie, and Sarah, in Quarry Lane, Glasnevin, Dublin in the 1911 Census of Ireland. He also had a foster brother, Paddy. He had attended St. Gabriels National School in Cowper Street. By trade he was an apprentice tailor and was 20 years old when he was hanged.

Trial and execution
Ryan, together with Patrick Doyle, Thomas Bryan, and Frank Flood, were tried by Court-martial on 24 February 1921 and convicted of high treason and 'levying war against the King', following an attempted ambush at Drumcondra, Dublin on 21 January 1921. The four of them, along with Thomas Whelan and Patrick Moran, were hanged at Mountjoy Prison by executioner John Ellis on 14 March 1921, while a crowd of over 20,000 people protested outside. They were hanged in pairs: Whelan and Moran at 6am; Doyle and Ryan at 7am; and Bryan and Flood at 8am.

Reinterment
He is one of a group of men hanged in Mountjoy Prison in the period 1920-1921 commonly referred to as The Forgotten Ten. In 2001 he and the other nine, including Kevin Barry, were exhumed from their graves in the prison and given a full State Funeral. He is now buried in Glasnevin Cemetery, Dublin.

Bibliography 
 
 Thorne, Kathleen, (2014) Echoes of Their Footsteps, The Irish Civil War 1922-1924, Generation Organization, Newberg, OR, ISBN 978-0-692-245-13-2

References

1900s births
1921 deaths
20th-century executions by the United Kingdom
Burials at Glasnevin Cemetery
Executed Irish people
Irish Republican Army (1919–1922) members
Irish Republicans killed during the Irish War of Independence
People educated at Belvedere College
People executed by the British military by hanging
People executed for treason against the United Kingdom